Oedheim is a town in the north west of Baden-Württemberg, Germany. It is a small town with about 7,000 inhabitants. It belongs to the district Heilbronn.

References

Heilbronn (district)